Dalbury Lees is a civil parish in the South Derbyshire district of Derbyshire, England. The parish contains seven listed buildings that are recorded in the National Heritage List for England. Of these, one is listed at Grade II*, the middle of the three grades, and the others are at Grade II, the lowest grade. The parish contains the villages of Dalbury and Lees and the surrounding countryside.  The listed buildings consist of a church, its former rectory, and farmhouses.


Key

Buildings

References

Citations

Sources

 

Lists of listed buildings in Derbyshire